Martha Ray (1746 – 7 April 1779) was a British singer of the Georgian era. Her father was a corsetmaker and her mother was a servant in a noble household. Good-looking, intelligent, and a talented singer, she came to the attention of many of her father's patrons. She is best known for her affair with John Montagu, 4th Earl of Sandwich. She lived with him as his mistress from the age of seventeen, while his wife was suffering from mental illness. She gave birth to nine children, five of whom survived, including the lawyer and philanthropist Basil Montagu. During this time, she conducted a successful singing career, for which she became well known, as well as completing her education with Lord Sandwich's support.

Life and career
Sandwich set Ray up in a residence in Westminster, and gave her a generous allowance, allowing her a place to stay during periods in which she did not wish to remain at his home. In public, although Sandwich was married, the two acted as husband and wife. During this period, Ray was introduced to a soldier, James Hackman, by Sandwich. Hackman became a frequent visitor, and is thought to have proposed marriage to Ray on several instances, but she declined each time. Also by this time, Sandwich was deeply in debt. It is believed that while Sandwich was financially generous to Ray, he did not offer her any long-term financial security, which may have been what led Ray into tolerating Hackman's advances.

In 1779, Hackman left the British Army to join the church. At some point, believed to have been around 1778, Ray and Hackman had become involved romantically, but this affair was short-lived, by most reports due to her believing he lacked the financial means and social status to support her. However, Hackman was completely infatuated with Ray, becoming increasingly jealous, and continued to pursue her.

Murder
On 7 April 1779, in the company of close friend and fellow singer Caterina Galli, Ray left her home to attend a performance of Isaac Bickerstaffe's comic opera Love in a Village. She had been approached by Hackman earlier that evening, but when she declined to tell him where she was going he followed her to the Royal Opera House at Covent Garden, where he murdered her. Hackman believed that she had taken another lover, William Hanger, Baron Coleraine, whom Hackman witnessed her meeting at Covent Garden. Whether she and Coleraine were involved in an affair has never been clearly established. Sandwich was devastated by her death. Hackman attempted to shoot himself following the murder, but only wounded himself, and was arrested. Two days after her 14 April burial, Hackman was sentenced to hanging, and the sentence was carried out on 19 April in front of a large crowd in Tyburn, London.

The events surrounding her murder were used in the popular 1780 novel Love and Madness by Herbert Croft.

Ray was buried in a vault under a pew in St Nicholas church, Elstree. During renovations of the church in 1824, the vault was re-discovered and Ray's remains moved to an unmarked grave in the churchyard. In 1920, the then Earl of Sandwich had a tombstone erected over the grave.

References

Bibliography

External links
Portraits from National Portrait Gallery
Details of her murder from a biography of James Hackman
The Murder of Martha Ray
British History Online, Martha Ray

1746 births
1779 deaths
English courtesans
British murder victims
People murdered in Westminster
18th-century British women singers
Violence against women in London